Helmut Gille (born 23 April 1939) is a German equestrian. He competed in two events at the 1972 Summer Olympics.

References

External links
 

1939 births
Living people
German male equestrians
Olympic equestrians of East Germany
Equestrians at the 1972 Summer Olympics
People from Salzwedel
Sportspeople from Saxony-Anhalt